Ludovic Oucéni (born 1 February 2001) is a French athlete. He competed in the men's 4 × 400 metres relay event at the 2020 Summer Olympics.

References

External links
 

2001 births
Living people
French male sprinters
Athletes (track and field) at the 2020 Summer Olympics
Olympic athletes of France
People from Villepinte, Seine-Saint-Denis
Athletes (track and field) at the 2018 Summer Youth Olympics
Sportspeople from Seine-Saint-Denis
21st-century French people